Boris Brejcha (born November 26, 1981 in Ludwigshafen am Rhein) is a German DJ and record producer. He describes his music style as "high-tech minimal." His style has been compared with DJ Umek, and Solomun.

Brejcha frequently wears a joker mask based on a Carnival of Venice design. He has performed at clubs and festivals around the world, including Tomorrowland, Timewarp and Exit festival. Boris founded the label Fckng Serious in 2015 with Ann Clue and Deniz Bul. He performed for the first time in Ibiza in August 2019, at Hï Ibiza club.

On 24 January 2020, Brejcha released his 6th album Space Diver  as his first album for Ultra Records.

In 2021, Brejcha had the 42nd position on DJ Mags Top 100 DJs.

Personal life
He was injured in the Ramstein air show disaster when aged 6, becoming badly burnt. He states in an interview:
This was a special incident in my life. I was alone, I was a little boy and I was in an extreme situation.

Discography

Albums

Singles

References

External links

1981 births
German DJs
German record producers
Living people
Club DJs
German dance musicians
Electronic dance music DJs
Masked musicians
Survivors of disasters